Edward Shearman Ross (September 1, 1915 – March 16, 2016) was an American entomologist. He majored in entomology at the University of California, Berkeley.
Before his PhD was conferred, he worked as curator of insects at the California Academy of Sciences.
He wrote many scientific and popular articles about the biology of the insects.

Ross served in the United States Army and was stationed in the Philippines and New Guinea.

Ross was a fellow of the Entomological Society of America since 1947.

Ross died on March 16, 2016, at his home in Mill Valley at the age of 100.

Family 
Ross married his wife Wilda, a botanist, in 1942, and had two children with her, Martha and Clark. He had three grandchildren.

References

American entomologists
1915 births
People associated with the California Academy of Sciences
University of California, Berkeley alumni
Scientists from the San Francisco Bay Area
20th-century American zoologists
2016 deaths
American centenarians
Men centenarians
Fellows of the Entomological Society of America
Military personnel from Spokane, Washington
Writers from Spokane, Washington